The Association of Governing Boards of Universities and Colleges (AGB) is an organization focused on empowering college, university, and foundation boards to govern with knowledge and confidence. AGB provides leadership and counsel to member boards, chief executives, organizational staff, policymakers, and other key industry leaders to help navigate the changing education landscape.

According to Gale Business Insights, the organization, "addresses the problems and responsibilities of trusteeship in all sectors of higher education and the relationships of trustees and regents to the president, the faculty, and the student body."

References

External links
 

Educational organizations based in the United States
University governance
501(c)(3) organizations
1921 establishments in the United States